This is a list of earthquakes in 1907. Only magnitude 6.0 or greater earthquakes appear on the list. Lower magnitude events are included if they have caused death, injury or damage. Events which occurred in remote areas will be excluded from the list as they wouldn't have generated significant media interest. All dates are listed according to UTC time. A fairly active year with 17 magnitude 7.0+ events. Tajikistan had 12,000 deaths from an event in October. 2,188 deaths occurred in Indonesia in January and Jamaica suffered from another January event which caused 1,000 deaths.

Overall

By death toll 

 Note: At least 10 casualties

By magnitude 

 Note: At least 7.0 magnitude

Notable events

January

February

March

April

May

June

July

August

September

October

November

December

References 

1907
 
1907